Adriaen van Diest (1655–1704) was a Dutch painter, who worked in England.

Life
He was born at the Hague in 1655, the son of Jeronymus van Diest, a painter of sea-pieces, by whom he was instructed in the art. When he was seventeen years old he moved to London, where he was employed by Granville, Earl of Bath, for whom he painted several views and ruins in the west of England. He also painted portraits, but did not meet with much encouragement, although his pictures, particularly his landscapes, possess considerable merit; as a proof of which Horace Walpole states that there were seven pictures by Van Diest in Sir Peter Lely's collection. He etched several landscapes from his own designs, in a slight, masterly style. Van Diest died in London in 1704.

Unfortunately for his reputation, he is generally known by his worst pictures, which are frequently found in old houses, on wainscots, or over doors, and are executed in a hasty manner, with much mountainous background. His better pictures have changed their name.

References

Sources

 

1655 births
1704 deaths
17th-century Dutch painters
Artists from The Hague
Dutch expatriates in England
Dutch landscape painters